Tightness may refer to:

In mathematics,
 Tightness of (a collection of) measures is a concept in measure (and probability), theory in mathematics
 Tightness (topology) is also a cardinal function used in general topology

In economics,
 Tightness refers to the degree to which the number of unemployed workers exceed the number of posted job vacancies (or vice versa).
 Market tightness, a point in time where it is very difficult to invest, but it is far easier to sell or to remove investments in return of monetary rewards

In other fields,
 Tightness of a rope indicates the rope is under tension
 Tightness of a sealing means it is impermeable, that it seals well
 Tightness is the art of being 'tight' (i.e., stingy or miserly)
 Tightness can refer to something being cool